Thornholme Priory was a priory  in Lincolnshire, England, lying on the western side of the Ancholme carrs between the villages of Broughton and Appleby.

References

Monasteries in Lincolnshire